Leszek Nowosielski may refer to:

 Leszek Nowosielski (footballer) (born 1992), Polish footballer
 Leszek Nowosielski (fencer) (born 1968), Canadian fencer
 Leszek Nowosielski (painter) (1918–2000), Polish painter